Ömerli, formerly known as Amara, is a village in Halfeti, Şanlıurfa Province, southeastern Turkey.  The population is estimated at 1,182. Many of the population have moved to Germany for employment. Kurdish is spoken widely in the village. It has a small primary school with nearby villages providing secondary or further education.

The village was founded by the Paulicians.

The village is the birthplace of  Abdullah Öcalan, the leader of the Kurdistan Workers' Party (PKK), who was born there on April 4, 1949. Every year on his birthday thousands of Kurds celebrate his birthday. On April 4, 2009, a group of 3,000 Kurds was marching towards Amara to celebrate Öcalans 60th birthday. The march was interrupted by Turkish authorities resulting in clashes. Two men lost their lives.

In the municipal elections on the 31 March 2019 Hüsamettin Altındağ of the AKP was elected Mayor.

Notable people 

 Abdullah Öcalan (*1949), Founder of the Kurdistan Workers' Party
 Osman Öcalan (1958-2021), Kurdish Military commander.
 Ömer Öcalan (*1987), politician of the Peoples' Democratic Party (HDP) and a current member of the Grand National Assembly of Turkey

References 

Kurdish settlements in Turkey
Villages in Halfeti District
Populated places in Şanlıurfa Province